Contakt is the fifth studio album by the Norwegian urban music duo Madcon. It was released on 21 June 2012. The album entered the Norwegian Albums Chart at number 18. This is the first album recorded entirely in their native language.

Track listing

Singles
 Å Lø 
 Fest På Smedstad Vest
 Fåkke Fly Bort
 Kjører På

Charts

Release history

References

2012 albums
Madcon albums
Norwegian-language albums